Clube Desportivo Paço d'Arcos is a rink hockey club from Paço de Arcos, Portugal. Its senior team participates in the Portuguese Roller Hockey First Division.

Honours

National
Portuguese Roller Hockey First Division: 8
1942–43, 1944–45, 1945–46, 1946–47, 1947–48, 1948–49, 1953–54, 1955–55

International
CERS Cup: 1
1999–00

External links
Official website

Rink hockey clubs in Portugal